Sleepless in Madrid or Insomnia is a 1998 Spanish comedy film directed by Chus Gutiérrez. It stars Cristina Marcos, Candela Peña, Ernesto Alterio, María Pujalte and Ginés García Millán.

Plot 
Set in Madrid, focusing on the psychological developments and casual relationships through the urban routine of a group of young people, and bringing in elements of costumbrismo mixed with metaphors of a "self-absorbed" social environment, the plot tracks the lives of three sleepless people, Evan, Alba and Juan (and their partners) during the hot Summer. Adrián is with Alba (a mother who has just given birth) whereas Juan is worried by his future with his would-be wife Isabel.

Cast

Production 
The film was produced by Bocaboca and Sogetel. Arnaldo Catinari was responsible for the cinematography whereas Mateo Alonso was responsible for the music. The budged amounted to 250 million ₧.

Release 
The film was theatrically released in Spain on 13 February 1998.

Reception 
Augusto Martínez Torres of El País assessed the film to be a "fun comedy that works perfectly".

See also 
 List of Spanish films of 1998

References

Bibliography 
 
 
 

1998 comedy films
Spanish comedy films
Films set in Madrid
1990s Spanish-language films
1990s Spanish films